Őrtilos is the westernmost village of Somogy county, Hungary.

Etymology
Its former name was Őr. The tilos came in the 19th century into the name.

External links
 Street map (Hungarian)

References 

Populated places in Somogy County